The Royal Order of the Engabu (English: Order of the Shield) is a single-grade royal order, within the Kingdom of Bunyoro in Uganda and is awarded solely by the Omukama of Bunyoro. The order was re-established in 2010, replacing the old Royal Order of the Crown. The name change was done to make sure that the Order of the Crown and the Order of the Coronet Wearer were not confused. The honour is junior to the ancient Royal Order of the Omujwaara Kondo. It is normally granted twice a year, once during the Empango ceremony (which most often is on June 11 each year) and the other on the birthday of the Omukama (H.M. Solomon Iguru I's birthday is June 18)

The recipients of The Order of the Engabu are invested with a breast star that is 90 millimeters in diameter,  which is worn at Empango ceremonies or other appropriate formal occasions. Members of the Order sit in a special place of honour during the Empango events.

Originally, recipients of the Order of the Engabu were required to attend the Empango ceremony within a few years of receiving the order, but as of May 7, 2014 this practice has been waived.

The Order is one of three royal orders established or reformed in 2010 as a part of a modernization process in the Kingdom, and is listed as a "Non-Ruling Dynastic Honor and Order of Merit" by the Augustan Society.

Intergenerational transfer rules

This  Order  is  inherited  by  the  original  grantee's  eldest child  of  the  same  sex  at  the  moment  of  the  original  grantee's death  or  renunciation  of  the  honour.  For  male  grantees,  the honour passes by patrilineal primogeniture. For female grantees, the honour passes by matrilineal primogeniture.

Titles
There are several aspects of the award that recipients of the Order receive, and these are akin to Order of the Omujwaara Kondo and are mentioned in Section 5(b) of the Order's statutes.
 First, all recipients are entitled to the style "The Most Honourable". However, persons entitled to an existing style that supersedes "The Most Hon." will retain it within the Order's records.
 Second a recipient is entitled to use the title of Omukungu (which is a less prestigious title than Omujwaara Kondo). Official authorization is granted for a male recipient to translate Omukungu into "Knight" in English and a female recipient may translate this into "Dame".
 The original recipient of the Order may use "1st" before the post-nominals (OEBKK) in order to show he is the first to receive the Order, his son who inherits the order may then use "2nd OEBKK", his son may use "3rd OEBKK" and so on.

Thus, a typical modern recipient of the Order would be styled The Most Hon. Omukungu First Name Surname, 1st OEBKK.

The title of Omukungu comes from the ancient title of "Abakungu okusemera omu Engabu" roughly translating into "Chiefs worthy to be in (wear a) crown".

Heraldic privileges
Additionally, per Section 20 of the Order's statutes, persons who receive the honour are also entitled to the right to display certain heraldic privileges. This section reads:
20. Heraldry of Members
Heraldry has historically been limited in Bunyoro-Kitara Kingdom, with the exception of the Kingdom having an armorial achievement in the ensign of its historical flag and His Majesty the Omukama having similar heraldry. However, to honour some Members whose ancestors maintained heraldic customs, by authorization of His Majesty the Omukama, all Members of the Order who desire to have heraldry are entitled to display supporters and top their helm with a basic coronet if they desire to signify their status as Members.

Images of the Order

Recipients 
 Muedzul Lail Tan Kiram

References 

 
Orders, decorations, and medals of Uganda
Omukama Chwa II Kabalega
Awards established in 2010